John Heinrich (born 1978/1979) is an American politician and former member of the Minnesota House of Representatives. A member of the Republican Party of Minnesota, he represented District 35A in the northwestern Twin Cities metropolitan area.

Early life, education, and career
Heinrich graduated from Meadow Creek Christian School in 1998. He was a military police officer in the 4th Marine Division of the United States Marine Corps from 1999 to 2007.

Minnesota House of Representatives
Heinrich was first elected to the Minnesota House of Representatives in 2018.

Personal life
Heinrich and his wife, Jessica, have three children. He resides in Anoka, Minnesota.

References

External links

 Official House of Representatives website
 Official campaign website

1970s births
Living people
People from Anoka, Minnesota
Republican Party members of the Minnesota House of Representatives
21st-century American politicians